The following is list of universities and colleges in Hainan.

See also
List of universities in China
 Higher education in China

References
List of Chinese Higher Education Institutions — Ministry of Education
List of Chinese universities, including official links
Hainan Institutions Admitting International Students

External links
 

 
Hainan